Ian Spencer Wardle (born 27 March 1970) is an English former footballer.

Career
Ian Wardle was signed for Barnsley from schoolboy forms by former Manager Allan Clarke in 1986. He made his league debut against Middlesbrough in September 1989. This was before He suffered a double break of his left leg following a collision with Robbie Earle during a match vs Port Vale in March 1990. That was his last professional game and he left the club after making nine appearances in the Football League to join Frickley Athletic.

Notes

1970 births
Living people
Footballers from Doncaster
English footballers
Association football goalkeepers
Barnsley F.C. players
Frickley Athletic F.C. players
English Football League players